The Second Filat Cabinet was the Cabinet of Moldova from 14 January 2011 to 30 May 2013. The Cabinet consisted of ministers from the Liberal Democratic Party of Moldova, the Democratic Party of Moldova, and the Liberal Party, who together formed the Alliance for European Integration. It was the second government to be led by Vlad Filat who was Prime Minister from 2009 until 2013. The Cabinet was installed after a successful vote of confidence held in the Parliament of Moldova on 14 January 2011.

Composition 
The Cabinet consisted of the Prime Minister of Moldova Vlad Filat (leader of the Liberal Democratic Party of Moldova; PLDM), three Deputy Prime Ministers, each representing one of the parties of the coalition, 15 ministers, and two ex officio members.

The Government has 16 Ministries: two Deputy Prime Ministers are also Ministers, while the Minister of State does not lead a Ministry.

Cabinet of Ministers 

 Vlad Filat (PLDM), Prime Minister of Moldova  
 Iurie Leancă (PLDM), Deputy Prime Minister, and Minister of Foreign Affairs and European Integration 
 Mihai Moldovanu, Deputy Prime Minister for Social Affairs
 Valeriu Lazăr (PDM), Deputy Prime Minister, and Minister of Economy 
 Eugen Carpov, Deputy Prime Minister for Reintegration
 Victor Bodiu (PLDM), Head of the State Chancellery
 Victor Catan, Minister of Internal Affairs to 14 January 2011
 Alexei Roibu, Minister of Internal Affairs to 14 January 2011
 Dorin Recean, Minister of Internal Affairs from 24 July 2012
 Veaceslav Negruță (PLDM), Minister of Finance
 Alexandru Tănase (PLDM), Minister of Justice to 6 May 2011
 Oleg Efrim (PLDM), Minister of Justice from 6 May 2011 
 Andrei Usatîi, Minister of Health
 Vitalie Marinuţa (PL), Minister of Defence
 Anatol Șalaru (PL), Minister of Transport and Road Infrastructure
 Gheorghe Șalaru (PL), Minister of Environment
 Ion Cebanu (PL), Minister of Youth and Sports
 Marcel Răducan (PDM), Minister of Public Works and Regional Development
 Valentina Buliga (PDM), Minister of Labour, Social Protection and Family
 Boris Focșa (PDM),  Minister of Culture
 Mihail Șleahtițchi, Minister of Education
 Vasile Bumacov, Minister of Agriculture and Food Industry 
 Pavel Filip, Minister of Information Technologies and Communication

Ex-officio members 
 Mihail Formuzal, Governor of Gagauzia
 Gheorghe Duca, Head of the Academy of Sciences of Moldova

See also 
 Cabinet of Moldova

External links 
 Government of Moldova

References

 

Moldova cabinets
Alliance for European Integration
Coalition governments
2011 establishments in Moldova
Cabinets established in 2011
2013 disestablishments in Moldova
Cabinets disestablished in 2013